Nelson McCormick may refer to:

Nelson B. McCormick (1847–1914), U.S. Representative from Kansas
Nelson McCormick (director), American film and television director